Nyctocyrmata is a genus of moths belonging to the family Tineidae.

Species
Nyctocyrmata crotalopis Meyrick, 1921 (from South Africa)
Nyctocyrmata numeesia  Mey, 2011 (from Namibia)

References

Myrmecozelinae
Moths of Africa